Tingena siderota is a species of moth in the family Oecophoridae. It is endemic to New Zealand and has been observed at Mount Arthur, Arthur's Pass and in the Hawkes Bay. The adults of this species are on the wing in January and are said to be abundant on the flowers of species in the genus Aciphylla.

Taxonomy 
This species was first described in 1888 by Edward Meyrick using specimens collected on Mount Arthur in January. Meyrick originally named this species Cremnogenes siderota. In 1915 Meyrick placed this species within the Borkhausenia genus. In 1926 Alfred Philpott studied and illustrated the genitalia of the male of this species. George Hudson discussed and illustrated this species under the name B. siderota in his 1928 publication The butterflies and moths of New Zealand. In 1988 Dugdale placed this species in the genus Tingena. The female lectotype is held at the Natural History Museum, London.

Description

Meyrick described this species as follows:
This species can be distinguished from its close relatives because of its brilliant colour and the leaden-metallic fasciae.

Distribution 

This species is endemic to New Zealand and has been observed at its type locality of Mount Arthur as well as Arthur's Pass. This species has also been observed in the Hawkes Bay. It is regarded as being a rare species.

Behaviour 
The adults of this species are on the wing in January.

Habitat 
This species has been collected at altitudes of around 4500 ft and is said to be abundant on the flowers of Aciphylla.

References

Oecophoridae
Moths of New Zealand
Moths described in 1888
Endemic fauna of New Zealand
Taxa named by Edward Meyrick
Endemic moths of New Zealand